İsmail Hakkı Karadayı (25 April 1932 – 26 May 2020) was a Turkish general, who became the 20th Commander of the Turkish Armed Forces on 30 August 1993. He served between 1994 and 1998 as the 22nd Chief of the Turkish General Staff for a four-year term and was succeeded by General Hüseyin Kıvrıkoğlu. On 13 April 2018, a Turkish court sentenced him to life imprisonment for his role in the 1997 Turkish military memorandum. During his General Staff, the Turkish army carried out Operation Dawn and Hammer against the PKK in Northern Iraq.

References

 

1932 births
2020 deaths
People from Çankırı
Turkish Army generals
Turkish Military Academy alumni
Army War College (Turkey) alumni
Commanders of the Turkish Land Forces
Chiefs of the Turkish General Staff